Jonathan Famery (born 13 July 1988) is a French former professional footballer who played as an attacking midfielder.

References

External links
 
 

Living people
French footballers
1988 births
Association football midfielders
Dijon FCO players
Entente SSG players
FC Gueugnon players
Aviron Bayonnais FC players
Red Star F.C. players
People from Villeurbanne
Sportspeople from Lyon Metropolis
Footballers from Auvergne-Rhône-Alpes